In enzymology, a 1-pyrroline-4-hydroxy-2-carboxylate deaminase is an enzyme that catalyzes the chemical reaction

1-pyrroline-4-hydroxy-2-carboxylate + H2O  2,5-dioxopentanoate + NH3

Thus, the two substrates of this enzyme are 1-pyrroline-4-hydroxy-2-carboxylate and H2O, whereas its two products are 2,5-dioxopentanoate and NH3.

This enzyme belongs to the family of hydrolases, those acting on carbon-nitrogen bonds other than peptide bonds, specifically in cyclic amidines.  The systematic name of this enzyme class is 1-pyrroline-4-hydroxy-2-carboxylate aminohydrolase (decyclizing). This enzyme is also called HPC deaminase.  This enzyme participates in arginine and proline metabolism.

References 

 
 

EC 3.5.4
Enzymes of unknown structure